Acta Chromatographica is a quarterly peer-reviewed scientific journal published by Akadémiai Kiadó (Budapest, Hungary). It covers research on all aspects of chromatography. The current editors-in-chief was Teresa Kowalska (University of Silesia in Katowice) and is Mieczyslaw Sajewicz (University of Silesia in Katowice). It was established in 1992 by the Institute of Chemistry at the University of Silesia in Katowice, and is gold open access.

Abstracting and indexing
The journal is abstracted and indexed in:
CAB Abstracts
ProQuest databases
 Science Citation Index Expanded
 Scopus
 Veterinary Science Database
According to the Journal Citation Reports, the journal has a 2021 impact factor of 2.011, ranking it 66th out of 87 journals in the category "Analytical Chemistry".

References

External links

Publications established in 1992
Chemistry journals
Creative Commons Attribution-licensed journals
Quarterly journals
Akadémiai Kiadó academic journals